jq is a very high-level lexically-scoped functional programming language in which every JSON value is a constant.  jq supports backtracking and managing indefinitely long streams of JSON data. It is related to the Icon and Haskell programming languages. The language supports a namespace-based module system, and has some support for closures. In particular, functions and functional expressions can be used as parameters of other functions. 

The original implementation of jq was in C; gojq is a "Pure Go" implementation.  There is also a Rust implementation of
a large subset of jq named jaq,
for which a denotational semantics has been specified.

gojq should run on any platform where Go is supported, and likewise for
jaq and Rust.

History
jq was created by Stephen Dolan, and released in October 2012. 
It was famously described as being "like sed for JSON data".  Support for regular expressions was added in jq version 1.5.

A "wrapper" program for jq named yq adds support for YAML, XML and TOML. It was first released in 2017.

The Go implementation, gojq, was initially released in 2019. gojq notably extends jq to include support for YAML.

The first version of jaq to include extensive support for regular expressions
was released in March 2023. This version (0.10) also includes
a fast JSON parser but still lacks support for 
nested functions, recursively defined functions,
and does not include a "streaming parser" for processing
very large JSON documents with minimal memory requirements.

Usage

Command-line usage
jq is typically used at the command line, and can be used with other command-line utilities, such as curl. Here is an example showing how the output of a  command can be piped to a jq filter to determine the category names associated with this Wikipedia page:

$ curl 'https://en.wikipedia.org/w/api.php?action=parse&page=jq_(programming_language)&format=json' | jq '.parse.categories[]["*"]'
The output produced by this pipeline consists of a stream of JSON strings, the first few of which are:
"Articles_with_short_description"
"Short_description_matches_Wikidata"
"Dynamically_typed_programming_languages"
"Functional_languages"
"Programming_languages"

The `curl` command above uses the MediaWiki API for this page to produce a JSON response. 

The jq filter shown is an abbreviation for the jq pipeline:
.["parse"] | .["categories"] | .[] | .["*"]
Notice that the jq pipeline is constructed in the same manner using the '|' character as the Unix-style pipeline.

Embedded usage 
Both the C and the Go implementations provide libraries so that jq functionality can be embedded in other applications and programming environments.

For example, gojq has been integrated with SQLite so that a `jq` function is available in SQL statements. This function is marked as
"deterministic" and
can therefore be used in "CREATE INDEX" commands.

Modes of operation
jq by default acts as a "stream editor" for JSON inputs, much
like the sed utility can be thought of as a "stream editor" for lines of text.
However jq has several other modes of operation: 

 it can treat its input from one or more sources as lines of text;
 it can gather a stream of inputs from a specified source into a JSON array;
 it can parse its JSON inputs using a so-called "streaming parser" that produces a stream of [path, value] arrays for all "leaf" paths.

The "streaming parser" is particularly useful when one of more of the
JSON inputs is too large to fit into memory, since its memory requirements
are typically quite small.  For example, for an arbitrarily large array of JSON objects,
the peak memory requirement is not much more than required to handle the largest
top-level object.

These modes of operation can, within certain limitations, be combined.

Syntax and semantics

Types
Every JSON value is itself a value in jq, which accordingly has the types shown in the table below.  The gojq implementation distinguishes between integers and non-integer numbers, and supports unbounded-precision integer arithmetic.

`null` is a value, just like any other JSON scalar; it is not a pointer or a "null-pointer".
`nan` (corresponding to NaN) and `infinite` (see IEEE 754) are the only two jq scalars that are not also JSON values.

Forms
There are special syntactic forms for function creation, conditionals, stream reduction, and the module system.

Filters
Here is an example which shows how to define a named, parameterized filter for formatting an integer in any base
from 2 to 36 inclusive.
The implementation illustrates tacit (or point-free) programming:

# Use gojq for infinite precision integer arithmetic
def tobase($b):
    def digit: "0123456789ABCDEFGHIJKLMNOPQRSTUVWXYZ"[.:.+1];
    def mod: . % $b;
    def div: ((. - mod) / $b);
    def digits: recurse( select(. >= $b) | div) | mod ;

    select(2 <= $b and $b <= 36)
    | [digits | digit] | reverse | add;

The next example demonstrates the use of generators in the classic "SEND MORE MONEY" verbal arithmetic game:

def send_more_money:
    def choose(m;n;used): ([range(m;n+1)] - used)[];
    def num(a;b;c;d): 1000*a + 100*b + 10*c + d;
    def num(a;b;c;d;e): 10*num(a;b;c;d) + e;
    first(
      1 as $m
      | 0 as $o
      | choose(8;9;[]) as $s
      | choose(2;9;[$s]) as $e
      | choose(2;9;[$s,$e]) as $n
      | choose(2;9;[$s,$e,$n]) as $d
      | choose(2;9;[$s,$e,$n,$d]) as $r
      | choose(2;9;[$s,$e,$n,$d,$r]) as $y
      | select(num($s;$e;$n;$d) + num($m;$o;$r;$e) == num($m;$o;$n;$e;$y))
      | [$s,$e,$n,$d,$m,$o,$r,$e,$m,$o,$n,$e,$y] );

Parsing Expression Grammars
There is a very close relationship between jq and the Parsing Expression Grammar (PEG) formalism.

The relationship
stems from the equivalence of the seven basic PEG operations and the jq constructs shown in the following table.

Notes

References

Bibliography

Others

External links
 jq homepage
 gojq - the Pure Go implementation
 jq FAQ
 Awesome jq - curated listing of jq-related resources
 The jq Programming Language page on the Rosetta Code comparative programming tasks project site

Dynamically typed programming languages
Functional languages
Programming languages
Programming languages created in 2012
Query_languages
2012 software